Tritonaclia is a genus of moths in the subfamily Arctiinae.

Species
 Tritonaclia inauramacula Griveaud, 1964
 Tritonaclia kefersteini Butler, 1882
 Tritonaclia melania Oberthür
 Tritonaclia quinquepunctata Griveaud, 1966
 Tritonaclia stephania Oberthür
 Tritonaclia tollini Kerfenst., 1870

Former species
 Tritonaclia erubescens Hampson, 1901

References

Natural History Museum Lepidoptera generic names catalog

Arctiinae